Dyspessa cerberus is a moth in the family Cossidae. It was described by Franz Daniel in 1939. It is found in Turkey and Syria.

The length of the forewings is 8–10 mm.

Subspecies
Dyspessa cerberus cerberus (Turkey)
Dyspessa cerberus albinervis Yakovlev, 2008 (Syria)

References

Moths described in 1939
Dyspessa
Moths of Asia